Mouly may refer to:

Françoise Mouly (born 1955), Paris-born French artist and designer
Georges Mouly (1931–2019), French politician, professor, and member of the European Democratic and Social Rally group
Ieng Mouly (born 1950), Cambodian politician
Marcel Mouly (1918–2008), French artist who painted in an abstract style